The Obregón is a Mexican designed semi-automatic pistol designed in the mid-1930s by the mechanical engineer Alejandro Obregón. It uses the same .45 caliber ammunition as the Colt 1911 and it resembles the 1911 in overall appearance, frame size and weight. However it features a rotating barrel locking system. This system employs a diagonal cam on the rear of the barrel sliding against a diagonal receiver-mounted groove that rotates the barrel. This is like the Austro-Hungarian Steyr M1912 pistol, unlike the "swinging link and pin" of the Colt M1911 series.

One of the Obregón's design simplifications is that the safety switch and the slide lock are a single unit. Less than 1,000 of these pistols were produced at the national armory in Mexico City between 1934 and 1938. It was not a sales success, nor was it commissioned by the Mexican government.

See also
Ballester–Molina
Mendoza RM2
Mondragón rifle
Trejo pistol
Zaragoza Corla

References

 The .45 Obregon Pistol: A Mexican 1911, Garry James, gunsandammo.com

.45 ACP semi-automatic pistols
Semi-automatic pistols of Mexico
1911 platform